SoS can refer to:

 Scotland on Sunday, a Scottish weekly newspaper.
 Scrum of scrums, a technique to operate scrum at scale. Scrum is a framework within project management for developing, delivering, and sustaining products in a complex environment.
 Son Of Sardaar, a 2012 Indian film.
 "Secret of success", a colloquial phrase with varied interpretations across cultures.
 System of Systems, systems that pool their resources and capabilities together to create a new, more complex system.